The Beautiful Liar is a 1921 American comedy film directed by Wallace Worsley and written by Ruth Wightman. The film stars Katherine MacDonald, Charles Meredith, Joseph J. Dowling, Kate Lester, and Wilfred Lucas. The film was released on December 26, 1921, by Associated First National Pictures.

Cast       
Katherine MacDonald as Helen Haynes / Elsie Parmelee
Charles Meredith as Bobby Bates
Joseph J. Dowling as MacGregor
Kate Lester as Mrs. Van Courtlandt-Van Allstyn
Wilfred Lucas as Gaston Allegretti

References

External links

1921 films
Silent American comedy films
1921 comedy films
First National Pictures films
Preferred Pictures films
Films directed by Wallace Worsley
American silent feature films
American black-and-white films
1920s American films